{{DISPLAYTITLE:C21H23N3O2}}
The molecular formula C21H23N3O2 (molar mass: 349.426 g/mol, exact mass: 349.1790 u) may refer to:

 MDA-19
 Panobinostat

Molecular formulas